Robinson Díaz (born 1 May 1966 in Envigado, Antioquia, Colombia) is a Colombian actor. He is best known for his popular character El Cabo of series as El cartel, El Señor de los Cielos. He is also a teacher of Dramatic Art of the National School of Dramatic Art, graduated from the University of Antioquia.

Filmography

References 

1966 births
Living people
20th-century Colombian male actors
21st-century Colombian male actors
Colombian male telenovela actors
Colombian male television actors
Colombian film actors